Shin Jin-sik (born 1 February 1975) is a South Korean volleyball player. He competed at the 1996 Summer Olympics and the 2000 Summer Olympics.

Television appearances
2020, King of Mask Singer (MBC): Contestant as "Crunchy Balloon Bread" (episode 285)

References

External links
 

1975 births
Living people
South Korean men's volleyball players
Olympic volleyball players of South Korea
Volleyball players at the 1996 Summer Olympics
Volleyball players at the 2000 Summer Olympics
Place of birth missing (living people)
Asian Games medalists in volleyball
Asian Games gold medalists for South Korea
Asian Games silver medalists for South Korea
Volleyball players at the 1998 Asian Games
Volleyball players at the 2002 Asian Games
Volleyball players at the 2006 Asian Games
Medalists at the 1998 Asian Games
Medalists at the 2002 Asian Games
Medalists at the 2006 Asian Games
21st-century South Korean people